Tricholamia is a genus of longhorn beetles of the subfamily Lamiinae, containing the following species:

 Tricholamia plagiata Bates, 1884
 Tricholamia ruficornis (Hintz, 1911)

References

Lamiini